The Diocese of Dunkeld was one of the 13 historical dioceses of Scotland preceding the abolition of Episcopacy in 1689.

History
It is thought that the diocese was constituted as far back as the middle of the ninth century. The first occupant was styled Bishop of Fortriu, the name by which the kingdom of the northern Picts was then known. This bishop was also styled Abbot of Dunkeld, perhaps holding jurisdiction, formerly enjoyed by Iona, over the other Columban monasteries in Scotland.

The new bishopric appears to have included a great part of what afterwards became the Diocese of Argyll, and retained its jurisdiction over various churches representing old Columban foundations. There were thirty-five bishops of Dunkeld from its foundation until the suppression of the Catholic hierarchy during the Protestant Reformation in the sixteenth century.

The Catholic cathedral, situated in the Perthshire town of Dunkeld, was erected between 1220 and 1500. After the Reformation the cathedral fell partly into ruins, although the choir is used for Presbyterian worship.

Despite the Reformation and the hostility of the new Church of Scotland to bishops, episcopacy was not finally abolished until 1689, although there had been a temporary abolition from 1638 until the beginning of the 1660s. The diocese was restored by the Catholic Church (with a different boundary), on 4 March 1878, by Pope Leo XIII. The new Roman Catholic Diocese of Dunkeld is one of the suffragan sees of the archiepiscopal province of St. Andrews and Edinburgh, and includes the counties of Perth, Angus, Clackmannan, Kinross, and the northern part of Fife. The diocesan cathedral, now dedicated to Saint Andrew rather than Columba, is located in Dundee, the residence of the great majority of the Catholics of the modern diocese. The cathedral chapter, erected in 1895, consists of a provost and eight canons.

Bishops

Parishes

Deanery/ies of Angus (or Rattray)
 Abernyte
 Auchterhouse
 Fern
 Menmuir
 Tealing

Deanery of Atholl and Drumalban
 Alyth
 Ardeonaig
 Auchtergaven
 Bendochy
 Blair (now Blair Atholl)
 Cargill
 Clunie
 Dull
 Dunkeld Cathedral
 Fortingall
 Dunkeld, Holy Trinity
 Inchcadin (now Kenmore)
 Killin
 Kilmaveonaig
 Kinclaven
 Lethendy
 Little Dunkeld
 Logie Allochie (now Lagganallachy)
 Logiebride
 Logierait
 Lude
 Lundeiff (now Kinloch)
 Meigle
 Melginch (now St. Martins)
 Moneydie
 Moulin
 Rannoch (or Killichonen)
 Rattray
 Redgorton
 Ruthven
 Strathardle (now or Kirkmichael)
 Struan
 Weem

Deanery of Fife and Fothriff
 Aberdour
 Auchtertool
 Crombie
 Dalgety
 Fithkil (now Leslie)
 Rosyth
 Saline
 Strathmiglo

Deanery of Lothian
 Abercorn
 Aberlady
 Bunkle
 Cramond
 Preston

Deanery of Strathearn
 Aberdalgie
 Alva
 Crieff
 Dollar
 Forgrund (or Forgandenny)
 Lecropt
 Madderty
 Muckersie
 Tibbermore

See also
Bishop of Dunkeld, the historical bishop.
Bishop of Dunkeld (Roman Catholic), the restored Roman Catholic Bishop.
Roman Catholic Diocese of Dunkeld, the restored Roman Catholic Diocese.
Bishop of Saint Andrews, Dunkeld and Dunblane, the Scottish Episcopal Bishop.
Diocese of Saint Andrews, Dunkeld and Dunblane, the Scottish Episcopal Diocese.

Bibliography
 Cowan, Ian B., The Parishes of Medieval Scotland, Scottish Record Society, Vol. 93, (Edinburgh, 1967)
 Watt, D.E.R., Fasti Ecclesiae Scotinanae Medii Aevi ad annum 1638, 2nd Draft, (St Andrews, 1969), pp. 138–9

Dunkeld
Christianity in Perth and Kinross